Jonas Jessue da Silva Júnior (born 10 February 1987), simply known as Jonas, is a Brazilian footballer who plays as a right back.

Honours
Internacional
Campeonato Gaúcho: 2008

Sport
Campeonato Pernambucano: 2009

Coritiba
Campeonato Paranaense: 2011, 2012

References

External links
 
 Guardian Stats Centre
 
 CBF 
 globoesporte 

1987 births
Living people
People from Votuporanga
Brazilian footballers
Association football defenders
Campeonato Brasileiro Série A players
Campeonato Brasileiro Série B players
Campeonato Brasileiro Série C players
Mirassol Futebol Clube players
Associação Desportiva São Caetano players
Sport Club Internacional players
Sport Club do Recife players
Coritiba Foot Ball Club players
CR Vasco da Gama players
Club Athletico Paranaense players
Avaí FC players
Atlético Clube Goianiense players
Red Bull Brasil players
Criciúma Esporte Clube players
América Futebol Clube (MG) players
Botafogo de Futebol e Regatas players
Joinville Esporte Clube players
Ituano FC players
Cuiabá Esporte Clube players
Footballers from São Paulo (state)